Jeffrey Marc Monforton (born May 5, 1963) is an American prelate of the Roman Catholic Church.  He has been serving as the bishop of the Diocese of Steubenville in Ohio since 2012.

Biography

Early life 
Jeffrey Monforton was born on May 5, 1963, in Detroit, Michigan. He is the son of Marc Louis and Virginia Rose (Ackerman) Monforton, and is the eldest of three sons. Monforton received his early education at Tinkham Elementary School and John Marshall Junior High in Westland, Michigan.  He graduated from Wayne Memorial High School in Wayne, Michigan.

Monforton attended Wayne State University in Detroit.  He then studied for the priesthood at Sacred Heart Major Seminary in Detroit, where he received a degree in philosophy. He then attended Pontifical North American College and Pontifical Gregorian University in Rome, earning a bachelor's degree, licentiate and doctorate in sacred theology.

Priesthood 
On June 25, 1994, Monforton was ordained a priest for the Archdiocese of Detroit by Cardinal Adam Maida in the Cathedral of the Most Blessed Sacrament in Detroit. After his ordination, Monforton served as the associate pastor and teacher of religion in the parish high school at the National Shrine of the Little Flower in Royal Oak, Michigan, staying there until 1996. He served Cardinal Maida as a priest secretary from 1998 to 2005, and was a faculty member of Sacred Heart Seminary from 2002 to 2005.

Pope Benedict XVI named Monforton a chaplain of his holiness, with the title monsignor, in 2005. Monforton then served as pastor of St. Therese of Lisieux Parish in Shelby Township, Michigan from 2005 to 2006.  In 2006, he became rector of Sacred Heart Seminary, serving there until 2012. From May until July 2012, Monforton was pastor of St. Andrew Parish in Rochester, Michigan. Monforton joined the board of trustees of Madonna University in Livonia, Michigan, in 2006 and he was an apostolic visitator of the Congregation for Catholic Education during the 2005 to 2006 academic year.

Bishop of Steubenville 
On July 3, 2012, Monforton was named the bishop of the Diocese of Steubenville by  Benedict XVI.  His episcopal consecration took place on September 10, 2012. Archbishop Dennis Schnurr was the consecrating prelate. Cardinal Maida and Archbishop Allen Vigneron were the co-consecrators.

Since 2012, Monforton has served on the United States Conference of Bishops (USCCB) Subcommittee on Aid to the Church in Central and Eastern Europe; in 2019, he was named chair of the subcommittee.  In 2013, Monforton announced plans renovate Holy Name Cathedral.

In 2017, the diocese embarked on a year of re-consecration to the Immaculate Heart of Mary, patroness of the diocese.  The diocese formed an 18-person ad hoc task force to ascertain the present pastoral needs of the diocese.  A survey was also shared with all the priests and parishioners.

In May 2018, the diocese discovered that the financial department had been misallocating funds from employee paychecks since 2004.  Monforton started a forensic audit of the diocesan finances dating back to 2004. As a result. the diocese was forced to pay $3.5 million in employee taxes. The diocese was forced to suspend its plans to renovate Holy Name Cathedral.  Following austerity measures, the diocese balanced its financial standing.  Vicar General Kurt Kemo resigned from his church positions;  he was later convicted of felony theft, having stolen over $289,000 from the diocese.

In 2019, Monforton became a member of the USCCB Committee on National Collections. Following a request from Catholic Relief Services, Monforton visited Iraq in 2019 to assess their needs.

After the 2020 murder of George Floyd in Minneapolis, Monforton released this statement:“The horrible and inexcusable death of Mr. George Floyd is indisputable proof that the cancer of racism continues to permeate our society. Any discrimination against our brothers and sisters, especially racial prejudice, is an active virus that poisons the life blood of any community and society. Together as we experience outrage resultant of Mr. Floyd’s death, we must confront the tragedy of racial injustice." In January 2021, Monforton and the diocese were sued for $1 million by a Glouster, Ohio, woman regarding sexual abuse by a diocese priest, Henry Christopher Foxhoven.  The woman said that Foxhoven impregnated her in 2017 when she was a young teenager attending his church.  The suit also stated that an affidavit for a 2018 arrest warrant stated that Foxhaven told Monforton that he had been “sexually involved with a juvenile member of his congregation and that she was now pregnant.”  On April 14, 2021, the diocese was dismissed from the lawsuit, leaving Monforton as the defendant.

See also

 Catholic Church hierarchy
 Catholic Church in the United States
 Historical list of the Catholic bishops of the United States
 List of Catholic bishops of the United States
 Lists of patriarchs, archbishops, and bishops

References

External links

Roman Catholic Diocese of Steubenville Official Site

Episcopal succession

1963 births
Living people
Clergy from Detroit
People from Steubenville, Ohio
Pontifical North American College alumni
Pontifical Gregorian University alumni
21st-century Roman Catholic bishops in the United States
Roman Catholic bishops of Steubenville
Roman Catholic Archdiocese of Detroit
Sacred Heart Major Seminary faculty
Religious leaders from Michigan